Tanigawa may refer to:

Tanigawa (surname)
Tanigawa (train), a Japanese train service
Mount Tanigawa, a Japanese mountain

See also
Tanikawa